The National Fund for Development Projects (FONADE) is a government financial institution of Colombia that provides grants and lines of credit to support feasibility and pre-feasibility studies of development projects in the public sector, especially those entities undergoing privatization.

References

Government agencies established in 1968
National Planning Department (Colombia)
Privatization in Colombia
Economy of Colombia
1968 establishments in Colombia
Finance in Colombia